Stephen Lambdin (born Stephen Thomas Lambdin, March 9, 1988) is an American taekwondo competitor. He represented Team USA at the 2016 Olympic Games in Rio, Brazil. He represented the United States at the 2011 Pan American Games, where he won a bronze medal. He trains with coach Jeff Pinaroc in Mansfield Texas. He is a graduate of Colleyville Heritage High School and California Lutheran University.

Lambdin competes in the heavyweight division (+190 lbs/+87 kg).
As of May 1, 2013, Lambdin was ranked 10th in the WTF World Taekwondo rankings. As of March 18, 2019, Lambdin was ranked 13th in the Olympic Kyorugi Ranking (Senior Division / M+80 kg) and 10th in the World Kyorugi Ranking (Senior Division / M+87 kg).

References

1988 births
Living people
American male taekwondo practitioners
California Lutheran University alumni
Colleyville Heritage High School alumni
Pan American Games bronze medalists for the United States
Pan American Games medalists in taekwondo
Taekwondo practitioners at the 2011 Pan American Games
Medalists at the 2011 Pan American Games
21st-century American people